Ricky John Stuart  (born 7 January 1967) is an Australian professional rugby league football coach who is the head coach of the Canberra Raiders in the NRL and a former rugby league footballer who played as a  in the 1980s, 1990s and 2000s.

He was also the head coach of the New South Wales State of Origin team, having replaced Craig Bellamy following a fifth consecutive failure in the 2010 series. Stuart had previously been coach of the Australian national side, and has coached National Rugby League clubs, the Sydney Roosters (taking them to three consecutive grand finals from 2002–2004), Cronulla-Sutherland Sharks and the Parramatta Eels.

A former international representative rugby league and rugby union player – a dual-code international – Stuart also played State of Origin for New South Wales in the first Gould era. At club level, Stuart was the half-back of the "Green Machine", the Canberra Raiders team that won three premierships in 1989, 1990 and 1994 and were runners-up in 1991 who were coached by Tim Sheens. As a player Stuart was noted for his ability to throw long, spiralling passes to both the left and right sides of the field.

Early life
Stuart was born in Queanbeyan, New South Wales, Australia.

He had originally played rugby league as a child, but he took up rugby union while attending St Edmund's College.

Rugby union career
Stuart was selected for the ACT Schoolboys in 1984.

Stuart's union career was with the Queanbeyan Whites before being selected for the Wallabies tour of Argentina in 1987. Stuart played three tour matches but no Test matches. Stuart played in both the Fly-half and Scrum-half positions.

Rugby league career

Canberra
Stuart then switched codes to league and joined the Canberra Raiders team in 1988, winning the club's player of the year award that season. He was a key member of the club's most successful period in the late 1980s, and early 1990s, playing  inside a backline including legendary talents Laurie Daley, Mal Meninga and Gary Belcher. Stuart would go on to win three premierships with the Canberra Raiders. After the 1989 Grand Final victory, Stuart travelled to England with the Raiders for the 1989 World Club Challenge which was lost to Widnes.

Stuart was named man-of-the-match in the second game of the 1990 State of Origin series. He won the Clive Churchill Medal in the Raiders' 1990 grand final victory. He debuted in the first test of the 1990 Kangaroo tour against Great Britain in London in October 1990, playing five-eighth outside Allan Langer. This appearance saw him become Australia's 38th dual code rugby international, following Michael O'Connor and preceding Scott Gourley. He replaced Langer at halfback in the next test. In 1992 and 1993, Stuart was again named the Raiders' player of the year  and in 1993 Stuart won the Dally M Medal for the Winfield Cup's Player of the Year. He went on the 1994 Kangaroo Tour and his first test of the tour was the 2nd test. He was again preceded by Langer.

Canterbury-Bankstown
Stuart retired from first grade after playing 243 games for the Canterbury-Bankstown Bulldogs and Canberra Raiders in 1989 to 2000 after failing to recover from a recurring knee injury.

Coaching career

Sydney Roosters

Stuart began his first grade coaching career in 2002 with the Sydney Roosters, taking over from Graham Murray and winning the premiership in his first year as coach. Having won the 2002 NRL Premiership, the Roosters travelled to England to play the 2003 World Club Challenge against Super League champions, St Helens R.F.C. Stuart coached Sydney to a 38-0 victory. That year he took the Roosters to the 2003 NRL grand final but they lost to the Penrith Panthers.  The 2004 Stuart-coached Roosters side was also beaten in the Grand Final, but the team struggled in 2005 and 2006. Stuart's contract was terminated and he left the Roosters two weeks before the end of the 2006 season.

Cronulla-Sutherland Sharks
In 2007, Stuart took over from Stuart Raper as head coach of the Cronulla-Sutherland Sharks with a two-year contract, which was then extended to the end of the 2011 playing season.

Despite the Sharks making the preliminary finals in 2008, Stuart's time with the club was marred by a horror year in 2009. Not only was the club in dire financial straits but the Cronulla Sharks club was also tarnished by media allegations about a 2002 group-sex incident involving former Sharks players, player Reni Maitua's dismissal after testing positive to drugs, removal of the captaincy from key player Paul Gallen, due to making racist remarks several unsavoury incidents involving now-disgraced CEO Tony Zappia (including his assault of a female staff member and involvement in an insurance-fraud fan donation scandal).

On 19 July 2010, Stuart resigned as Cronulla-Sutherland coach six weeks before the end of the 2010 season.  Stuart said that he decided to leave Cronulla after he felt that he no longer had the support of his players.  Stuart went on to say "I just feel I can’t get that extra bit out of them at the moment, Talking to the players at halftime and after the game, I could probably sense with them that this was the only decision".

Stuart leaving the club ended yet another tenure prematurely and at loggerheads with club executives, members and players, with Cronulla appointing Shane Flanagan as his replacement.

Parramatta Eels
Stuart signed a lucrative three-year contract with the Parramatta Eels, beginning in 2013. This meant that Stuart had to stand down as the head coach of the New South Wales State of Origin team, as the state had put in a policy that the head coach would not have any relation to an NRL club. The Eels had in recent years been perennial underachievers, with Stuart set the unenviable task of resurrecting the team after the team finished last in 2012. However, in the round 4 match against the Roosters, Stuart suffered the worst defeat in his NRL coaching career, losing 50-0. In the aftermath of the game, Stuart said at the press conference "I can't say it won't happen again, it will and I hope to turn it around quickly but it won't, it is going to take a long time to turn it around, we have to keep building our roster because it is not up to the level of other rosters".

In April 2013 Stuart was fined $10,000 for questioning a referee's impartiality following a loss to the Gold Coast.

On 11 September 2013, Stuart announced that he was quitting the Parramatta Eels to join the Canberra Raiders as head coach on a three-year contract to continue his coaching career.

Canberra Raiders
Stuart took up the head coach position of the Canberra Raiders on a three-year deal in 2014.

Following Canberra's loss in round 10 of the 2014 NRL season, Stuart spoke to the media saying "When you get shit refereeing, sorry, when you get poor refereeing decisions that are just incorrect, purely incorrect, that frustrates you because it’s a tight competition and every game’s a tight game".  Stuart was later fined $10,000 by the NRL for his post match comments.

In 2016, Stuart coached Canberra to a second-placed finish at the end of the regular season.  In week one of the finals, Canberra were upset in front of a sold-out home crowd losing to eventual premiers Cronulla 16-14.  Canberra would defeat Penrith the following week to qualify for the club's first preliminary final in 19 years. Canberra went on to fall short of a grand final appearance losing to Melbourne 14-12.

In July 2018 after a match against the Cronulla-Sutherland Sharks in which a refereeing mistake led to a try lost the raiders the game, Stuart demanded that the NRL overhaul the bunker system responsible to reviewing potential tries.

In the 2019 NRL season, Stuart guided Canberra to a 4th-place finish at the end of the 2019 regular season.  Canberra would then go on to defeat Melbourne and South Sydney to qualify for their first grand final in 25 years.  In the 2019 NRL Grand Final against the Sydney Roosters, Canberra lost the match 14-8 in controversial circumstances. During the second half of the game and with only 10 minutes remaining, Canberra were initially given a new six tackle set after referee Ben Cummins had ruled that the Sydney Roosters had touched the ball.  Canberra player Jack Wighton would then be tackled with the ball.  Cummins later ruled that it was not a repeat set and it was a handover to the Sydney Roosters. In the following minutes, Roosters player James Tedesco would score the match winning try.

In the post match press conference, Stuart told the media "You all saw it. None of us here will be commenting on that tonight. It's not the time to talk about it".

In the 2020 NRL season, Stuart guided Canberra to a fifth placed finish on the table as they qualified for the finals.  Canberra would eventually reach the preliminary final before losing to Melbourne 30-10. In the post match press conference, Stuart walked out after answering only one question.

In round 8 of the 2021 NRL season, Canberra were defeated by South Sydney 34-20 which included two tries that were disallowed against Canberra. In the post match press conference Stuart said "I'll look like a whinger, which I don't really give a shit about being labelled a whinger, but when you get a game out there where it's 8-1 in penalties, I just think it needs a discussion".
Canberra would finish the 2021 NRL season in a disappointing 10th place on the table after the club were tipped to reach the finals and once again challenge for the premiership.

Following Canberra's 36-6 loss against Penrith in round 7 of the 2022 NRL season, Stuart was asked by journalists following the match on his thoughts about the Penrith crowd mocking Canberra's viking clap.  Stuart responded with “Is that really a big focus point?, Well if that is all we have got to talk about Fuck me dead".
Following Canberra's loss against Penrith in round 21 of the 2022 NRL season, Stuart commented on Penrith player Jaeman Salmon who had kicked out at Canberra's Tom Starling whilst he was playing the ball.  Stuart went on to say "I've had history with that kid. I know that kid very well. He was a weak gutted dog as a kid and he hasn't changed now. He's a weak gutted dog person now".
On 9 August 2022, Stuart was fined $25,000 and suspended for one match from the NRL over his comments towards Salmon.

Representative Coaching

State of Origin
In 2005, Stuart was appointed coach of the New South Wales.ref></ref> Although Stuart only coached the NSW side for just one series, the Blues managed to win the series 2-1 after losing the first match in golden point. On 17 November 2010, Stuart was appointed as the state's first full-time coach of the New South Wales State of Origin team for two years. Stuart's victory in 2005 was the last time NSW won an origin series until the Laurie Daley coached Blues won in 2014.

Stuart coached the Blues for the 2011 series, which was lost to the Maroons by two games to one.

Stuart continued in the NSW head coaching role for the 2012 series, which was once again lost by two games to one. For the second consecutive year however, New South Wales won Game II in Sydney. Shortly after signing on as Parramatta Eels coach for the 2013 season onwards, Stuart resigned from his role as NSW coach.

Australia
In December 2005, Stuart was appointed as coach of Australian national rugby league team, replacing Wayne Bennett after Australia's loss in the 2005 Tri-Nations Final to New Zealand by a scoreline of 24-0. This meant that Stuart had to stand down as coach of the New South Wales State of Origin team. Stuart enjoyed success with the Kangaroos: winning the Anzac Tests of 2006 and 2007, as well as the 2006 Tri-Nations.  In addition, at the end of the 2007 season, the team won a one-off Test against New Zealand.

2008 World Cup controversy 
Stuart's Australian team lost the 2008 Rugby League World Cup Final to New Zealand, 34–20. Afterwards he was reported to be so incensed by the defeat that he verbally attacked Geoff Carr, the Chief Executive of Australian Rugby League, claiming that tournament organizers and match officials conspired to cause the Australian loss. The next morning he had a chance meeting with Ashley Klein, who refereed the final, and Stuart Cummings, England's director of referees, at their hotel. He is reported to have verbally abused both officials in front of a number of witnesses, calling Klein a cheat, and of being physically and aggressively intimidating.

Statistics

Personal life
Stuart is married to his wife Kaylie and they have three children - daughter Emma and two sons Jackson and Jed.

Stuart was appointed a Member of the Order of Australia in the 2021 Queen's Birthday Honours, for "significant service to rugby league, and to the community".

The Ricky Stuart Foundation
In 2011, inspired by his daughter being diagnosed with autism, Stuart and his wife founded the Ricky Stuart Foundation, a charity which aims to raise support for autism and to assist with the provision of carers and support for families.  The Raiders replace their major jersey sponsor for one round each year with the foundation's logo to help raise further support.

References

External links
Canberra Raiders profile
 Stuart Appointed Kangaroos Coach Australian Rugby League
 Sydney Roosters Profile Sydney Roosters Rugby League 2006
 National Rugby League Profile National Rugby League Home
 Ricky Stuart Rugby League Tables & Statistics
 State of Origin / New South Wales Players Rugby League Tables & Statistics
Wallabies profile

1967 births
Living people
Australia national rugby league team coaches
Australia national rugby league team players
Australian rugby league coaches
Australian rugby league players
Australian rugby union players
Autism activists
Canberra Raiders captains
Canberra Raiders coaches
Canberra Raiders players
Canterbury-Bankstown Bulldogs players
Clive Churchill Medal winners
Country New South Wales Origin rugby league team players
Cronulla-Sutherland Sharks coaches
Dual-code rugby internationals
Members of the Order of Australia
New South Wales City Origin rugby league team players
New South Wales Rugby League State of Origin coaches
New South Wales Rugby League State of Origin players
Parramatta Eels coaches
Rugby league players from Queanbeyan
Rugby league halfbacks
Sydney Roosters coaches